The Wagner Manufacturing Company was a family-owned manufacturer of cast iron and aluminum products based in Sidney, Ohio, US. It made products for domestic use such as frying pans, casseroles, kettles and baking trays, and also made metal products other than cookware. Wagner was active between 1891 and 1952, and at one time dominated the cookware market, selling in Europe and the US. The purchasers of the company in 1952 continued the brand, and Wagner products are still manufactured today. The original items are prized by collectors.

Foundation

The Wagner Manufacturing Company was founded by the brothers Milton M. and Bernard P. Wagner in Sidney, Shelby County, Ohio.
The architect Joseph Altenbach started construction of the Wagner manufacturing complex in 1890.
He was a friend of the family head Mathias Wagner, and was responsible for many of the major buildings in Sidney during that period.
The company was incorporated in 1891.
The principal owners were Bernard, Milton, Louis, and William Wagner.
The brothers were joined by R.O. Bingham, who had in the past worked at the Marion Stove Works and the Sidney Manufacturing Company, who became superintendent of the company.

Operation

At first producing only cast-iron products, the company added nickel-plated ware in 1892.
In 1894 Wagner was one of the first to make aluminum cookware.
The company acquired their competitor Sidney Hollow Ware from Phillip Smith in 1897.
A third brother, William H. Wagner, joined the company to run this operation.
In 1903 Sidney Hollow Ware was sold back to Smith.
By 1913 Wagner was distributing its products globally.
The company said in its early advertisements:

Wagner grew into a major manufacturer of cast iron and aluminum products, selling in the US and Europe.
In addition to cookware it manufactured furnace grates, feed troughs, rubbish burners, kettles, and chemists' mortars.
The company won many awards, and at one point had a 60% market share in cookware.
Brand names included Wagner Ware, National, Long Life, Wardway and Ward's Cast Iron.

The "Magnalite" line of cast aluminum products was introduced in the early 1930s, made from a patented aluminum alloy. 
The company employed the industrial designer John Gordon Rideout to overhaul the design of Wagner's products in an effort to counter falling sales during the Great Depression.
In 1933 Rideout and his partner Harold Van Doren designed a Magnalite teakettle with varying thickness to maximize heat conductivity, and in 1934 they designed an Magnalite aluminum covered casserole for Wagner.

Starting in 1946 the heirs of the founding Wagner brothers divested their holdings in the company.
The Randall Company of Cincinnati, Ohio, a car parts manufacturer, bought the Wagner Manufacturing Company in 1952.

Post-acquisition

In 1957 Randall's Wagner division acquired Griswold Manufacturing from McGraw-Edison.
In 1959 Randall was itself acquired by Textron.
Textron sold the Wagner and Griswold lines to General Housewares Corporation (GHC) in 1969.
In 1996 GHC sold rights to the Wagner and Griswold lines to Slyman Group. After being allowed to fall into receivership, the Wagner factory and Wagner and Griswold trademarks were bought by the American Culinary Corporation of Willoughby, Ohio.
As of 2014 American Culinary continued to market products branded Wagner, Wagnerware, Magnalite and Griswold.
The Wagner and Griswold brands are highly valued by collectors.

References

Sources

Defunct manufacturing companies based in Ohio